Captain Kidd and the Slave Girl is a 1954 American adventure film directed by Lew Landers and starring Anthony Dexter, Eva Gabor, and Alan Hale Jr. It was distributed by United Artists. A woman who disguises herself as a slave girl in order to try to gain information from Captain Kidd about his hidden treasure.

Plot
A nobleman rescues Captain Kidd from the gallows in order to find his treasure.

Cast
Anthony Dexter as Captain William Kidd
Eva Gabor as Judith Duvall
Alan Hale Jr. as Jerry Simpson
James Seay as Earl of Bellomont
William Tannen as Steve Castle
Sonia Sorrell as Anne Bonny
Noel Cravat as L'ollonaise
Richard Karlan as Captain Avery
Lyle Talbot as Pace
Mike Ross as Blackbeard
Jack Reitzen as Captain Bartholomew
Robert Long as Calico Jack

References

External links
 
Captain Kidd and the Slave Girl at TCMDB

1954 films
1950s action adventure films
Pirate films
1950s English-language films
Films directed by Lew Landers
American action adventure films
Cultural depictions of William Kidd
Cultural depictions of Blackbeard
Cultural depictions of Calico Jack
Cultural depictions of Anne Bonny
Films produced by Edward Small
Films scored by Paul Sawtell
Films produced by Aubrey Wisberg
Films about slavery
Films with screenplays by Aubrey Wisberg
1950s American films